John or Jack Fulton may refer to:

John P. Fulton (1902–1965), American special effects supervisor and cinematographer
John Fulton (bullfighter) (1932–1998), American bullfighter
John Fulton (cricketer, born 1849) (1849–1908), New Zealand cricketer
John David "Dave" Fulton (born 1965), New Zealand cricketer
John Fulton (footballer) (1890–1926), Scottish footballer
John Fulton (instrument maker) (1803–1853), Scottish maker of Orrerys
John Fulton (writer) (born 1967), American author 
John H. Fulton (1792–1836), United States congressman from Virginia
John Edwin Fulton (1869–1945), Seventh-day Adventist missionary to Fiji
John Farquhar Fulton (1899–1960), American neurophysiologist and historian of science
John Fulton (priest) (1834–1907), Episcopal priest with The Living Church, writer, lecturer, journalist
John Fulton, Baron Fulton (1902–1986), British university administrator and public servant
John Hamilton Fulton (1869–1927), president of National Park Bank
John Russell Fulton (1896–1979), painter-illustrator
John Fulton, American TV host and cat behaviorist, best known for the TV series Must Love Cats and Cats 101
Jackie Fulton (born 1963), wrestler
Jack Fulton, founder of frozen food retailer Fulton's Foods
Jack Fulton (1903–1993), singer, trombone player and composer

See also
John Fulton Reynolds (1820–1863), American Civil War commander